JS Hiei (DDH-142) was the second ship of the Haruna-class helicopter destroyer of the Japanese Maritime Self Defense Force.

Overview 

These ships were Japan's first helicopter-equipped destroyer (DDH), and their greatest feature was that it can carry and operate three helicopters in spite of its 5000t class. Such ships, including the development-improved Shirane-class destroyer, can be said to be the only one in the world to this day, and strongly reflect Japan's special military ideology. In terms of equipment, it was the first self-defense ship to be equipped with a fin stabilizer to stabilize its attitude during helicopter operation, and a landing restraint device (bear trap) was installed to improve the safety and efficiency of flight work on a swaying ship.

Until the introduction of the Kongō-class destroyer (Aegis ship), this class (including the Shirane-class destroyer) were the largest escort ship of the JMSDF.

Construction and career 
Hiei was laid down on 8 March 1972 and launched on 13 August 1973 by IHI Corporation Tokyo Shipyard. She was commissioned on 27 December 1974, into the 1st Escort Corps and deployed in Yokosuka.

From July 3 to August 17, 1978, she participated in Hawaii dispatch training with her sister ship JDS Haruna, JDS Kuroshio and eight P-2J aircraft.

JDS Hiei, JDS Amatsukaze and eight P-2Js were dispatched to the United States from January 25, 1980, and participated in the Exercise RIMPAC 1980 exercise between February 26 and March 18. They were the first ships to participate from Japan. Returned to Japan on April 2.

On March 30, 1983, the 51st Escort Corps was abolished and became a ship under the direct control of the 1st Escort Corps.

On March 30, 1984, she was incorporated into the 4th Escort Corps as a flagship.

The FRAM refurbishment carried out from August 31, 1987 to March 13, 1989 improved anti-submarine search capability, individual ship air defense capability, combat command / information processing capability, and electronic warfare capability. However, the cost-effectiveness of FRAM refurbishment was not efficient, and similar large-scale refurbishment was only carried out on two Haruna-class vessels.

On March 2, 1995, due to the relocation of the 4th Escort Group Command to Kure, the homeport was transferred to Kure.

In 1996, she participated in the Exercise RIMPAC 1996.

From May 11 to August 12, 1999, she participated in the US dispatch training with JDS Myōkō and JDS Amagiri.

Participated in the Japan-Russia search and rescue joint training conducted off the coast of Petropavlovsk-Kamchatsky, Russia from September 1 to 11, 2000 with JDS Hamagiri.

From May 16 to August 3, 2001, participated in the US dispatch training with the JDS Chōkai and JDS Samidare.

On September 17, 2002, based on the Act on Special Measures Against Terrorism, dispatched to the Indian Ocean with JDS Samidare. Engaged in missions until December of the same year, and returned to Japan on January 26, 2003.

On October 28, 2003, she was dispatched to the Indian Ocean along with JDS Akebono and JDS Tokiwa. Engaged in missions until January 2004 and returned to Japan on March 3.

From June 6 to 10, 2005, she visited Vladivostok, Russia, and participated in the Japan-Russia search and rescue joint training off the coast of Vladivostok on the 10th.

In 2006, she participated in the Exercise RIMPAC 2006.

On March 26, 2008, the escort corps was reorganized and transferred to the 4th Escort Corps.

From July 23 to 27, 2010, participated in the Japan-Russia search and rescue joint training SAREX off the coast of Vladivostok, Russia, with JS Jintsū.

On March 16, 2011, she was decommissioned. Her final affiliation was the 4th Escort Corps and the homeport was Kure. The commissioning period was 36 years and 3 months, which is the longest among the ships of the Maritime Self-Defense Force in history, with a cruising distance of about 44 laps around the earth and a voyage time of about 79,000 hours.

Gallery

Citations

References 

 hazegray.org: Hiei DDH 142
 globalsecurity.org: DDH Haruna Class

Haruna-class destroyers
Ships built by IHI Corporation
1973 ships